Juaquin Iglesias (pronounced Hwah-KEEN; born August 22, 1987) is a former gridiron football wide receiver. He was drafted by the Bears in the third round of the 2009 NFL Draft. He played college football for the Oklahoma Sooners.

Early years
Born to Bobby and Bernita Iglesias, his father is a barber shop owner in Temple, Texas.  Began playing football for the Boys and Girls Club in Killeen, Texas. As a senior at Killeen High School in Killeen, Texas, Iglesias had 42 catches for 886 yards and 10 touchdowns, and was named first-team all-district (16-4A), under coach Sam Jones. He also ran track and field in the 400, 800, and 1,600 meter relays, and averaged 17 points per game in basketball.

College career
In his first season as a Sooner, 2005, he had 19 receptions for 290 yards. This included his first career touchdown catch at Oklahoma, a 21-yard touchdown-game winner from Rhett Bomar, in a double overtime win against the Baylor Bears, 37–30, on October 22.

In 2006, he had 41 catches for 514 yards. In the 2007 Fiesta Bowl against Boise State, he had a career-high 129 yards receiving, and caught the successful pass on a two-point conversion which allowed OU to tie the game with 1:26 remaining. He achieved a new career high in an Oklahoma victory against the University of Tulsa (62-21), on September 21, 2007, with 8 catches for 142 yards and two touchdowns.

Professional career

Pre-draft

Chicago Bears
Iglesias was drafted in the 3rd round (99th overall pick) of the 2009 NFL Draft by the Chicago Bears. He was signed to a four-year contract on June 10, 2009, and was expected to challenge Rashied Davis for the number three spot on the depth chart. During his rookie year he was active for only one game.

Minnesota Vikings
Iglesias was signed off the Bears practice squad by the Minnesota Vikings in preparation for the Week 17 game against the Detroit Lions.

Houston Texans
The Houston Texans signed Iglesias to their practice squad during the 2012 preseason.  On August 31, Iglesias was released by the Texans.

Toronto Argonauts
On February 21, 2013, Iglesias was signed by the Toronto Argonauts of the Canadian Football League. During the 2013 CFL season, Iglesias recorded 3 receptions for 65 yards. On September 25, 2013, Iglesias was released by the Argonauts.

Helsinki Wolverines
On February 6, 2013, the Helsinki Wolverines signed Iglesias alongside Columbus Givens III who Iglesias played with at Killeen High School.

References

External links 
Chicago Bears bio
 Iglesias page at Sooner Sports
 Iglesias page at Yahoo! Sports
 Toronto Argonauts profile

1987 births
American football wide receivers
Canadian football wide receivers
African-American players of American football
African-American players of Canadian football
Chicago Bears players
Living people
American sportspeople of Mexican descent
Oklahoma Sooners football players
Toronto Argonauts players
Players of American football from Texas
Sportspeople from Killeen, Texas
21st-century African-American sportspeople
20th-century African-American people